Bad Elster is a spa town in the Vogtlandkreis district, in Saxony, Germany. It lies on the border of Bavaria and the Czech Republic in the Elster gebirge hills. It is situated on the river White Elster, and is protected from extremes of temperature by the surrounding wooded hills. It is 25 km southeast of Plauen, and 25 km northwest of Cheb.
It is part of the Freunde im Herzen Europas microregion.

History

Elster before 1800 

Two kilometers north west of the town centre lies the remains of a twelfth-century walled village, known today as the "Alte Schloss" or "Old Castle". This was first documented in 1324. In 1412 a manor was sold to the von Zedtwitz family, who held it until 1800.

In 1533 the Reformation reached Adorf and its daughter church in Elster, and the first Protestant pastor was installed in 1540.

The healing properties of the waters from the spring now known as the Moritzquelle were recognised well before Georg Leisner, physician to the Duke Moritz von Sachsen-Zeitz, wrote in 1669 that inhabitants of both Adorf and Elster come to the spring to take the waters, and he had successfully used them on many different patients.

One famous visitor was Johann Wolfgang von Goethe, who came in 1795. He mentions the spring at Elster in his work Hermann and Dorothea.

(Bad) Elster in the 19th and 20th century 
Elster became an independent parish in 1851. In 1892 the old St. Peter und Paul church was demolished and replaced with the Revival Gothic, St. Trinitatiskirche.

Elster was promoted to be the "Königlich-Sächsischen Staatsbad", official royal spa of Saxony in 1848. With that the visitor numbers rose:  1848: 129; 1850: 378, 1860: 1,750, 1870: 2,450, 1890: 5,870, 1900: 8,900, 1990: 15,600.

Elster prepended the Bad, meaning "spa", in 1875, Bad Elster became its official name in 1935.  In  1880, Bademuseum Bad Elster opened; it was the first museum in the town and in Vogtland, but was short lived. A new museum opened in 1993.

Geography and transport

Places 
Places within Bad Elster include Sohl and Mühlhausen.

Demography 

Growth of Population (from 1964 on, as of December 31st):

Business 
The main industries are tourism and health.  There are seven clinics specialising in recuperation.  In 2005 there were 35 establishments offering accommodation with 2400 beds, and receiving 540,000 bednights.

The town lies near the B 92.  There are two open border crossings into the Czech Republic; open for pedestrians and bicycles but not cars, though post Schengen even the barrier has been removed.  The station is 2.5 km from the town centre at Mühlhausen on the Plauen Eger line where there is a two hourly service.

Politics

Town Council

The elections in May 2014 showed the following results:
 Unabhängige Bürgerschaft (Independent citizens) 4 seats
 Freie Wähler (Free Voters)(independent): 3 seats
 CDU: 3 seats
 The Left: 2 seats
 SPD: 2 seats

Coat of arms

Field gold (or), with a naturalistic Magpie standing on three green hills (vert). From centre hill, a spring (argent) with water flowing to pool (argent).

Attractions 
The most important buildings in Bad Elster are from the last quarter of the 19th century.
 The Royal Spa House (Königliche Kurhaus) is an important example of turn of the 20th century neoclassicism, demonstrating the importance of spa building to the state.
 The Albert Baths (Albert Bad) were built in the Jugendstil
 The King Albert Theatre (König Albert Theater), formerly called the spa theatre (Kurtheater), opened in 1914 and has been recently modernised. Alexander, Prince of Saxony, is the theatres patron. It is also an important conference venue for Saxony and the Euroregion.
 The Nature Theatre (NaturTheater) lies in a woodland setting. It is the oldest open-air theatre in Saxony. In 2007 it was adapted to meet modern standards and reopened, offering a six-month season of Opera, theatre, concerts and cinema.
 The 1892 Lutheran church of Holy Trinity (St.-Trinitatis-Kirche) was built in the Gothic revival style.  It contains artifacts from the previous building such as the gothic statues of SS Peter and Paul from c. 1490.
 The former luxury hotel building, the Wettiner Hof was listed for protection; and awaited renovation.  The building was eventually demolished.  
 There are also smaller monuments such as the Saxon post milestone (Postmeilensäule, 1724) and the Schiller Monument (Schillerdenkmal).

Twin town 
 Bad Waldsee, from 1990

Personalities

Sons and daughters of the town
 Christoph Albrecht (born 1944), theater and musicologist
 Klaus Ostwald (born 1958), GDR - ski jumper
 Heinz Wossipiwo (born 1951), GDR-ski jumper

Those associated with the site 

 Robert Flechsig (1817-1892), first fountain and spa doctor in the Royal Saxon Staatsbad
 Hermann Richard Otto Knothe (1891-1961), painter and graphic artist, died there
 Walter Ferdinand Damm (1889-1961), a painter, lived and worked in Bad Elster, died there
 Pierre Geisensetter (born 1972), moderator, spent his youth in Bad Elster

References

External links 

 Bad Elster town's homepage
Information around Bad Elster
Sächsische Staats Spas: Bad Elster Bad Brambach
GenWiki-Artikel on Bad Elster
Statistical Information from 1999

Spa towns in Germany
Vogtlandkreis